Ilona Király (1914-1979), was a female international table tennis player from Hungary.

Table tennis career
She won a silver medal in the 1950 World Table Tennis Championships in the Corbillon Cup (women's team event) with Gizi Farkas, Rozsi Karpati and Ilona Sólyom for Hungary.

She won the Hungarian National singles in 1936 and the doubles five times; 1944, 1948, 1949, 1951 and 1952 (with Gizi Farkas). She died in 1979.

See also
 List of table tennis players
 List of World Table Tennis Championships medalists

References

Hungarian female table tennis players
1914 births
1979 deaths
World Table Tennis Championships medalists